Jana Kramer is the debut album by American actress and country music artist Jana Kramer. It was released on June 5, 2012 via Elektra Records. The album was produced by Scott Hendricks. Its first single, "Why Ya Wanna," was released in January 2012. It also includes the previously released digital singles "Whiskey" and "What I Love About Your Love" and "I Won't Give Up" as a digital bonus track.

Background
In 2002, Kramer made her acting debut in the low budget independent horror film Dead/Undead. The following year Kramer guest appeared on All My Children which was marked as Kramer's television debut. Kramer has since continued to appear in a number of television shows such as CSI: Crime Scene Investigation, Grey's Anatomy, Private Practice and CSI: NY. She has also had small supporting roles in films such as Click, Prom Night and Spring Breakdown. After a long career of acting, in February 2011 Kramer signed a recording contract with Elektra Records. The following month Kramer began work on her debut album. Country music producer Scott Hendricks produced the majority of the record.

Singles
On January 16, 2012, Kramer released her official debut single, "Why Ya Wanna". Kramer premiered the official music video directed by Kristin Barlowe on February 6, 2012. The song peaked at number 50 on the US Billboard Hot 100 chart and number 3 on the US Billboard Hot Country Songs chart, as well as number 100 on Billboard'''s Canadian Hot 100. "Whiskey" was released as the album's second single on November 5, 2012.

Promotional songs
She premiered her promo track, "I Won't Give Up", which premiered in the One Tree Hill episode "Holding Out for a Hero", was released the following day exclusively on iTunes and Amazon. The song reached number 75 on the US Billboard Hot 100 chart.  In April 2011 Kramer released another promo track titled, "Whiskey" which she also performed on One Tree Hill''. The song reached number 99 on the US Billboard Hot 100 chart on digital sales alone.

Reception

Critical
Giving it four-and-a-half stars out of five, Roughstock writer Matt Bjorke said that Kramer "adds a potent vocal and burgeoning songwriting talent on top of her model looks". Taste of Country writer Billy Dukes gave it four stars, saying that "It’s clear Kramer had an idea of who she was as a singer before stepping into the recording studio." James Christopher Monger of Allmusic thought that the album "does a nice job blending the contemporary twang of artists like Carrie Underwood and Taylor Swift with the traditionalist spirit of classic country and folk crooners like Patsy Cline and James Taylor."

Commercial
The album debuted at No. 5 on the Top Country Albums and No. 19 on Billboard 200 upon its release in the US, selling 16,000 copies for the week.  The album has sold 185,000 copies in the US as of September 2015.

Track listing

Personnel

 Stephanie Bentley – background vocals
 Tom Bukovac – electric guitar
 Joshua Crosby – synthesizer
 Eric Darken – percussion
 Dan Dugmore – dobro, pedal steel guitar
 Shannon Forrest – drums, percussion
 Paul Franklin – dobro, pedal steel guitar
 Catt Gravitt – background vocals
 Tania Hercheroff – background vocals
 Aubrey Haynie – fiddle, mandolin
 Carolyn Dawn Johnson – background vocals
 Charlie Judge – keyboards, string arrangements
 Jana Kramer – lead vocals
 Troy Lancaster – electric guitar
 Gordon Mote – Hammond B-3 organ, piano, synthesizer, Wurlitzer
 Cherie Oakley – background vocals
 Carole Rabinowitz – cello
 Jimmie Lee Sloas – bass guitar
 Bryan Sutton – acoustic guitar
 Russell Terrell – background vocals
 Ilya Toshinsky – banjo, acoustic guitar
 Glenn Worf – bass guitar

Charts

Weekly charts

Year-end charts

Singles

References 

2012 debut albums
Jana Kramer albums
Elektra Records albums
Albums produced by Scott Hendricks